Chinú is a town and municipality located in the Córdoba Department, northern Colombia. It has an area of 624 km².

References

 Gobernacion de Cordoba - Chinú

Cordoba